Sambuca di Sicilia (Sicilian: Sammuca) is a comune (municipality) in the Province of Agrigento in the Italian region Sicily, located about  southwest of Palermo and about  northwest of Agrigento.

Sambuca di Sicilia borders the following municipalities; Bisacquino, Caltabellotta, Contessa Entellina, Giuliana, Menfi, Santa Margherita di Belice, and Sciacca.

History

The origins of the name Sambuca are uncertain. The main assumptions: from a Greek musical instrument in the shape of a harp; or from the elderberry plants, widespread since antiquity in the valley of Lake Arancio. Leonardo Sciascia breaks down the name Sambuca in as-Sabuqah and interprets it as a "remote place". Until 1928 the town was called Sambuca Zabut. In 1928, Benito Mussolini removed "Zabut" and added "di Sicilia".

Sambuca, founded by ancient Greek colonists, rose to regional prominence as a trading hub after invading Arab Muslims took over around 830, a few years after their landing in Sicily. It was called Zabuth, in remembrance of the emir Zabut ("The Splendid One") Al-Arab, who built a castle at that place, on the slopes of Mount Genuardo, between the rivers Belice and Sosius, 350 meters above sea level. Zabut Al-Maghrebi was a follower of the ascetic Ibn Mankud Conqueror 's "Burning Warrior of faith," Lord of the independent Kabyle of Trapani, Marsala, Sciacca.

Zabut was inhabited by a Muslim population until the 13th century, when it was conquered by Frederick II.

From the 15th to 19th centuries, Sambuca experienced alternating extremes of prosperity and poor economic times. The court passed the Roman family Barberini and new neighborhoods were built, the city wall was expanded, and palaces, baronial mansions, churches, monasteries, and convents were built. The Land of Sambuca was promoted from barony to marquessate with the privilege of Philip II of Spain (Madrid 15 November 1570). On 16 September 1666, the Marquessate of Sambuca passed to the Beccadelli family from Bologna, who had risen to the rank of princes of the Principality of Camporeale.

Sambuca in the 19th century was rich with culture, and in those years an enlightened middle class emerged. The writer, poet and patriot Vincenzo Navarro (it) died there in 1867.

The town's population declined in the 21st century due to its lacking economy and low birth rate. The population in the 2010s was 5834. Since the 2012 census, the town has seen a decrease of over 200 inhabitants.

Sambuca di Sicilia gained international media attention in January 2019 for selling homes in an auction with a starting price of €1, in hopes of attracting foreign residents to stop the area's depopulation. This became the basis for the HGTV documentary television series shot there, My Big Italian Adventure, starring American actress Lorraine Bracco and chronicling her months-long effort to renovate a roughly 200-year-old €1 townhouse at Via Guglielmo Marconi.

Geography 
Perched on a hill, with a Belvedere terrace at its peak, the town is surrounded by hills and woods, Mount Genuardo, and the valleys of the river Carboj that form the reservoir of Lake Arancio.

Main sights 

Belvedere terrace
remains of the  castle of the Emir.
palace Panitteri (17th century), home of the ethno-anthropological museum)
Palazzo dell'Arpa (town hall) 
Palazzo Ciaccio
setti vaneddi (seven Saracen alleyways)

Outside the center, are the ancient towers of Pandolfina and Cellaro, the Fortino di Mazzallakkar which emerge only in the summer months when the lake level is lowered. On Adranon mountain there is the 4th century BC archaeological complex. There is an old Arab house in the holiday area of Adragna.

Churches
 Santuario di Maria SS. dell'Udienza and Carmelites convent
Church of the Carmine with Antonello Gagini's marble statue of the Our Lady of the Audience
 Chiesa della Matrice
 Chiesa di San Michele Arcangelo
Church of St. Michael Archangel with its wooden equestrian statue of St. George, patron Saint of Sambuca di Sicilia, slaying the dragon.
 Chiesa del Rosario
 Chiesa della Madonna dei Vassalli
 Chiesa del Purgatorio
 Chiesa di Santa Caterina d'Alessandria and Benedictine monastery
 Chiesa della Concezione
 Chiesa di Gesù e Maria
 Chiesa di San Giuseppe
 Chiesa di San Calogero
 Chiesa di Santa Lucia
 Chiesa di Sant'Antonino
 Chiesa della Bammina
 Chiesa di San Giuseppe del Serrone
 Chiesa di San Giovanni Battista
 Convento dei Cappuccini
 Collegio di Maria
 Monastero di Santa Caterina d'Alessandria

Twin towns 
  Winter Haven, United States (1984), on the occasion of the Water Ski World Cup performed on the Lago Arancio, in Sambuca di Sicilia, Italy. Both cities are in fact involved in this sport.

References

External links
 Official website
 Pro loco Sambuca "L'Araba Fenicia" - Tourism promotion
 Sambuca di Sicilia on MySpace
 The Project City .com
 Sambuca di Sicilia, Agrigento, Sicily, Italy - e-borghi

Cities and towns in Sicily